Crush was a Canadian band based in Halifax, Nova Scotia. Leading band members were Paul Lamb and Cory Tetford. Other members included Santiago Serna, Scott MacFarlane and Brian Talbot.

History
Lamb and Tetford founded Crush in 2000.  The band released an album, Here in 2002, and a single from the album, "Live", was played on radio stations across Canada.

Crush was nominated for a Juno Award in 2003 as Best New Group.

In 2004, Crush earned five East Coast Music Awards, and was nominated for two more in 2005.

Discography

Studio albums
2002: Here
2003: Face in the Crowd

Singles
2002: "Live"
2002: "Here"
2003: "King for a Day"
2003: "Bad Enough"

Awards and recognition
2003: Juno Awards, nominee for New Group of the Year
7 wins at the East Coast Music Awards over various years

References

External links
Canadian Bands.com - Crush
Maple Music: Crush

Musical groups established in 2000
Musical groups disestablished in 2006
2000 establishments in Nova Scotia
2006 disestablishments in Nova Scotia
Musical groups from Halifax, Nova Scotia
Canadian pop music groups
MapleMusic Recordings artists